Barney may refer to:

People and fictional characters 
 Barney (given name), a list of people and fictional characters
 Barney (surname), a list of people

Film and television
 the title character of Barney & Friends, an American live action TV series for children
 Barney (film), a 1976 Australian film for children
 Barney (British TV series), a BBC children's television program

Places

United States
 Barney, Alabama, an unincorporated community in Walker County, Alabama
 Barney, Arkansas, an unincorporated community
 Barney, Georgia, an unincorporated community
 Barney, Iowa, an unincorporated community
 Barney, North Dakota, a city
 Barney Creek (Lorain County, Ohio)

Elsewhere
 Barney, Norfolk, an English village
 Mount Barney (Queensland), Queensland, Australia
 Barney Island, in the Torres Strait between Australia and New Guinea- see List of Torres Strait Islands
 5655 Barney, an asteroid

Other uses
 Barney (dog), a pet of former U.S. President George W. Bush
 , two destroyers and a torpedo boat

See also 
 
 
 Barny
 Barnie, a nickname and a surname
 Barni (disambiguation)